James Stoddard Boynton (May 7, 1833December 22, 1902) was an American politician and jurist.

Early life

Boynton was born in Henry County, Georgia on May 7, 1833. He was a lawyer, having passed the bar in 1852.

Civil War

Boynton fought in the Civil War, serving as a private with the 30th Georgia Infantry. He was wounded in the Battle of Atlanta, and achieved the rank of colonel by the end of the war. After the war, Boynton moved to Griffin in 1865.

Political life

Boynton briefly served as the 51st Governor of Georgia from 1883 after the death of governor Alexander Stephens. At the time of Stephens death, Boynton was serving as the president of the Georgia Senate so he assumed the governorship. His additional political service included the office of Mayor of Griffin, Georgia.

Boynton also served as a judge in the Spalding County, Georgia Court and the Flint Circuit Superior Court.

Death and legacy

He died at his home in Griffin in 1902 and was buried in Oak Hill Cemetery in that same city.

A street in Chickamauga, Georgia is named for him.

References

External links
Georgia State Archives Roster of State Governors
 Georgia Governor's Gravesites Field Guide (1776-2003)

1833 births
1902 deaths
People from Henry County, Georgia
Democratic Party governors of Georgia (U.S. state)
Democratic Party Georgia (U.S. state) state senators
Democratic Party members of the Georgia House of Representatives
Mayors of Griffin, Georgia
19th-century American politicians